Mike Jones (born April 26, 1983) is an American former professional boxer who competed from 2005 to 2014. He held the regional WBA–NABA and WBO–NABO welterweight titles.

Professional career
Mike Jones made his professional boxing debut on December 16, 2005 at the age of 22 against Jason Thompson who he would defeat by a second round technical knockout. By May 2007 Jones had compiled a record of 7-0, all by knockout no later than the third round. It was around this time that Jones was featured on the undercard of the Hugo Fidel Cazares vs. Wilfrido Valdez fight.

On August 29, 2008, Jones defeated Juliano Ramos to win the vacant NABA Welterweight title.

On April 17, 2010, Jones defeated Hector Munoz to defend his NABA title but also to win the vacant WBO NABO welterweight title.

On November 13, 2010,  Jones fought in Arlington, Texas vs. Jesus Soto Karass, on the undercard of Manny Pacquiao vs. Antonio Margarito. Many argued Karass was the winner, but the decision went the way of Jones. A rematch was made and Jones won.

Before the fight, Jones did a little mitt work with Floyd Mayweather Sr. "Floyd Mayweather said that with both hands, Mike is the hardest-hitting welterweight that he has ever worked the mitts with, and that he hits harder than Thomas Hearns," said Vaughn Jackson. "He said that if he continues to hit that way, then no welterweight will stand, and that includes Soto-Karass."

On December 3, 2011, Jones defeated Sebastian Andres Lujan by unanimous decision in an IBF Welterweight Title Eliminator. The fight took place at Madison Square Garden on the under card of Miguel Cotto vs Antonio Margarito II.

On June 9, 2012, Mike Jones fought Randall Bailey on the Pacquiao vs. Bradley undercard. Jones was knocked down in the 10th and stopped in the 11th round by veteran Bailey.  After a two-year layoff, Jones came back against Jaime Herrera. Jones lost that fight as well and has not fought since.

Professional boxing record

|-
|align="center" colspan=8|26 Wins (18 knockouts), 2 loss(es), 0 Draw, 0 No Contest
|-
|align=center style="border-style: none none solid solid; background: #e3e3e3"|Res.
|align=center style="border-style: none none solid solid; background: #e3e3e3"|Record
|align=center style="border-style: none none solid solid; background: #e3e3e3"|Opponent
|align=center style="border-style: none none solid solid; background: #e3e3e3"|Type
|align=center style="border-style: none none solid solid; background: #e3e3e3"|Rd., Time
|align=center style="border-style: none none solid solid; background: #e3e3e3"|Date
|align=center style="border-style: none none solid solid; background: #e3e3e3"|Location
|align=center style="border-style: none none solid solid; background: #e3e3e3"|Notes
|-align=center
|Loss
|26-2
|align=left| Jaime Herrera
|
|7 (10)
|
|align=left|
|align=left|
|-align=center
|Loss
|26-1
|align=left| Randall Bailey
|
|11 (12)
|
|align=left|
|align=left|
|-align=center
|Win
|26-0
|align=left| Sebastian Lujan
|
|12
|
|align=left|
|align=left|
|-align=center
|Win
|25-0
|align=left| Raúl Muñoz
|
|2 
|
|align=left|
|align=left|
|-align=center
|Win
|24-0
|align=left| Jesus Soto Karass
|
|12 
|
|align=left|
|align=left|
|-align=center
|Win
|23-0
|align=left| Jesus Soto Karass
|
|10 
|
|align=left|
|align=left|
|-align=center
|Win
|22-0
|align=left| Irving Garcia
|
|5 
|
|align=left|
|align=left|
|-align=center
|Win
|21-0
|align=left| Hector Munez
|
|5 
|
|align=left|
|align=left|
|-align=center
|Win
|20-0
|align=left| Henry Bruseles
|
|10
|
|align=left|
|align=left|
|-align=center
|Win
|19-0
|align=left| Raul Pinzon
|
|5 
|
|align=left|
|align=left|
|-align=center
|Win
|18-0
|align=left| Lenin Arroyo
|
|10
|
|align=left|
|align=left|
|-align=center
|Win
|17-0
|align=left| Dairo Esalas
|
|2 
|
|align=left|
|align=left|
|-align=center
|Win
|16-0
|align=left| Luciano Perez
|
|3 
|
|align=left|
|align=left|
|-align=center
|Win
|15-0
|align=left| Juliano Ramos
|
|6 
|
|align=left|
|align=left|
|-align=center
|Win
|14-0
|align=left| Gilbert Venegas
|
|8
|
|align=left|
|align=left|
|-align=center
|Win
|13-0
|align=left| Germaine Sanders
|
|8
|
|align=left|
|align=left|
|-align=center
|Win
|12-0
|align=left| Israel Cardona
|
|3 
|
|align=left|
|align=left|
|-align=center
|Win
|11-0
|align=left| Richard Hall
|
|1 
|
|align=left|
|align=left|
|-align=center
|Win
|10-0
|align=left| Martinus Clay
|
|5 
|
|align=left|
|align=left|
|-align=center
|Win
|9-0
|align=left| Doel Carrasquillo
|
|2 
|
|align=left|
|align=left|
|-align=center
|Win
|8-0
|align=left| Gilbert Guevara
|
|1 
|
|align=left|
|align=left|
|-align=center
|Win
|7-0
|align=left| Francisco Maldonado
|
|2 
|
|align=left|
|align=left|
|-align=center
|Win
|6-0
|align=left| Donnie Fosmire
|
|3 
|
|align=left|
|align=left|
|-align=center
|Win
|5-0
|align=left| Jason Jordan
|
|1 
|
|align=left|
|align=left|
|-align=center
|Win
|4-0
|align=left| Todd Brad Dillon
|
|1 
|
|align=left|
|align=left|
|-align=center
|Win
|3-0
|align=left| Ronny Glover
|
|1 
|
|align=left|
|align=left|
|-align=center
|Win
|2-0
|align=left| Chris Gray
|
|2 
|
|align=left|
|align=left|
|-align=center
|Win
|1-0
|align=left| Jason Thompson
|
|2 
|
|align=left|
|align=left|
|-align=center

References

External links

1983 births
Welterweight boxers
Boxers from Pennsylvania
Living people
American male boxers